Lloyd Meldrum Wickett (April 3, 1920 – April 9, 2002) was a National Football League defensive tackle for the Detroit Lions.

He grew up in Washington state, and attended Oregon State University on a football scholarship. He was drafted by the Detroit Lions in the 5th round of the 1943 NFL Draft. He played 4 games for them that year. He would miss the 1944 and 1945 seasons while serving in the Navy during World War II. He came back to the Lions in 1946 and played 10 games for them.

References

External links
Lloyd Wickett stats from Database Football

1920 births
2002 deaths
American people of Canadian descent
Sportspeople from Ontario
Canadian players of American football
American football defensive linemen
Oregon State Beavers football players
Detroit Lions players
United States Navy personnel of World War II